Stenhamra is a locality situated on the island Färingsö in Ekerö Municipality, Stockholm County, Sweden. It had 3,336 inhabitants as of 2010. The specialized Children's Library of Stenhamra is here.

References 

Populated places in Ekerö Municipality
Uppland